The Prix Gérard-Morisset is an award by the Government of Quebec that is part of the Prix du Québec, given to individuals who have made an outstanding contribution to preserving and explaining Québec's cultural heritage. The activities recognized for this award are research, creative work, training, production, preservation and dissemination in the areas of cultural property, archives, museology and traditional folk culture.  It is named in honour of Gérard Morisset.

Winners

References
 Award winners 

Prix du Québec